Wilhelm Brem (born 23 November 1977) is a Paralympic biathlete and cross-country skier representing Germany in the Winter Paralympics and the IPC World Championships. He often skis with Florian Grimm as his guide. As of the 2014 Winter Paralympics in Sochi, Brem has won 4 gold, 3 silver, and 4 bronze medals between the Paralympics games and the IPC World Championships. Brem was awarded the Silver Laurel Leaf in 2010, the highest athletic award in Germany. He was the German flag bearer during the closing ceremony of the 2014 Paralympics in Sochi.

Brem began losing his sight at eight years old; by fourteen, he was fully blind. He has been para-Nordic skiing since he was 16.

Results

References

External links
 

1977 births
Living people
German male biathletes
German male cross-country skiers
Paralympic biathletes of Germany
Paralympic cross-country skiers of Germany
Biathletes at the 1994 Winter Paralympics
Biathletes at the 1998 Winter Paralympics
Cross-country skiers at the 1998 Winter Paralympics
Biathletes at the 2002 Winter Paralympics
Cross-country skiers at the 2002 Winter Paralympics
Biathletes at the 2006 Winter Paralympics
Biathletes at the 2010 Winter Paralympics
Cross-country skiers at the 2010 Winter Paralympics
Biathletes at the 2014 Winter Paralympics
Medalists at the 2006 Winter Paralympics
Medalists at the 2002 Winter Paralympics
Medalists at the 1998 Winter Paralympics
Medalists at the 1994 Winter Paralympics
Paralympic medalists in biathlon
Paralympic gold medalists for Germany
20th-century German people
21st-century German people